Oberhofmeister of the Austrian King and Emperor (Grand Master of the Court) was the most important function at the court of the Holy Roman Emperor (until 1806) and the Emperor of Austria in Vienna (1804–1918). The Oberhofmeister acted as the direct head of the Imperial court and household and was as such very influential.

Position 

As can be seen in the annual Hof- und Staats Handbuch, the monarch's Obersthofmeister ranked directly behind the Royal family and above all other high nobility. The Obersthofmeister of the Monarch had his seat in the Hofburg in Vienna.

The tasks of His Majesty's Obersthofmeister's Office in Vienna included the administration of the castles and palaces used by the court, including construction work, the supervision of the k.k. Court theater (Hofburgtheater and Hofoper in Vienna), and especially the politically relevant planning of the ceremonial (e.g. speech and table arrangements, order of priority of the carriages) for formal appearances by the monarch and the preparation of invitations to the audience of the ruler. This position only ended upon the death of the Monarch or the Oberhofmeister himself.

When the unified Austrian Empire was reorganized into the dual monarchy of Austria-Hungary in 1867, a second Oberhofmeister was installed at the royal court in Budapest.
An example of a very influential Oberhofmeister, is Alfred, 2nd Prince of Montenuovo (1908–1917), who had a strong influence over the aging Franz Joseph I.

other use of the name Oberhofmeister 
The monarch's wife, had her own court with an Oberhofmeisterin (or Senior Lady in Waiting). The Crown Prince and other long-standing Archdukes were also entitled to employees with the title of Oberhofmeister. This title also appeared at other princely courts and also at smaller dynasties in Germany. The office of Obersthofmeister gradually gained everywhere the importance of a state office, comparable to a cabinet minister.

List of the Obersthofmeisters of the Austrian King and Emperor in Vienna 
 1619–1625 Hans Ulrich von Eggenberg
 1625–1626 Gundaker, Prince of Liechtenstein
 1626–1637 Leonard Helfrid, Count of Meggau
 1637–1650 Maximilian von und zu Trauttmansdorff
 1650–1655 Maximilian, Prince of Dietrichstein
 1655–1657 Johann Weikhard of Auersperg
 1657–1665 John Ferdinand, Count of Porcia
 1665–1674 Wenzel Eusebius, Prince of Lobkowicz
 1675–1682 Johann Maximilian von Lamberg
 1683-1683 Albert, Count of Zinzendorff and Pottendorff
 1683–1698 Ferdinand Joseph, Prince of Dietrichstein
 1699–1705 Ferdinand Bonaventura von Harrach
 1705–1709 Charles Theodore, Prince of Salm
 1709–1711 Johann Leopold von Trautson, Graf von Falkenstein
 1711–1721 Anton Florian, Prince of Liechtenstein
 1721–1724 Johann Leopold von Trautson, Graf von Falkenstein
 1724–1747 Sigmund Rudolph, Count of Sinzendorf and Thannhausen
 1747–1751 Dominik von Königsegg-Rothenfels
 1753–1769 Anton Corfiz Ulfeldt
 1769–1776 Johann Joseph, Count of Khevenhuller
 1776–1782 Joseph I Adam of Schwarzenberg
 1783–1807 Johann Georg Adam I. Fürst von Starhemberg
 1807–1827 Ferdinand Fürst von und zu Trauttmansdorff-Weinsberg
 1827–1835 vacant
 1835–1843 Rudolf, Prince of Colloredo-Mannsfeld
 1844–1848 vacant
 1848–1849 Karl Ludwig von Grünne
 1849–1865 Prince Karl of Liechtenstein
 1866–1896 Konstantin of Hohenlohe-Schillingsfürst
 1896–1908 Prince Rudolf of Liechtenstein
 1909–1917 Alfred, 2nd Prince of Montenuovo
 1917–1918 Konrad of Hohenlohe-Schillingsfürst
 1918      Leopold Graf Berchtold

See also 
Hofmeister (office)

References

Sources 
 Habsburger.net 
 German Wikipedia

Positions of authority
Government occupations
Austrian Empire
Obersthofmeister